The men's basketball tournament at the 2017 Southeast Asian Games was held in Kuala Lumpur, Malaysia at the MABA Stadium from 20 to 26 August. The Philippines successfully defended its championship for the record twelfth consecutive time. Indonesia settled for the silver medal for the second consecutive time, while Thailand again placed in the podium (with the last podium finish in 2013) after winning the bronze medal.

Competition schedule
The following was the competition schedule for the men's basketball competitions:

Draw
The draw for the tournament was held on 8 July 2017, 10:00 MST (UTC+8), at the Renaissance Kuala Lumpur Hotel, Kuala Lumpur. The 9 teams in the men's tournament were drawn into two groups of four and five teams. The teams were seeded into five pots based on their performances in the previous Southeast Asian Games, except Laos, who are debuting in this year's competition.

Participating nations

Competition format
The preliminary round will be composed of two groups of either four or five teams each. Each team will play the teams within their group. The top two teams per group will advance to the knockout round. The other teams qualify to the classification round.
Classification round:
5th place: Third place teams play for fifth place.
7th place: Fourth place teams play for seventh place.
8th place: Fifth place team in Group B play for eighth place against the loser of the 7th place match.
The knockout round is a single-elimination tournament, with a consolation game for the semifinals losers. In the knockout round, the winner of the third place game wins the bronze medal; the loser in the final is awarded the silver medal, while the winner wins the gold medal.

Results
All times are Malaysia Standard Time (UTC+8)

Preliminary round

Group A

Group B

Classification round
7th-9th place bracket

7th place match

8th – 9th place match

5th – 6th place match

Knockout round

Semifinals

Bronze medal match

Gold medal match

Final standings

See also
Women's tournament

References

Men